The Patriarchate of Karlovci or Serbian Patriarchate of Sremski Karlovci, was a patriarchate of the Eastern Orthodox Church that existed between 1848 and 1920. It was formed when the Metropolitanate of Karlovci was elevated to the rank of patriarchate. The Patriarchate of Karlovci nominally existed until 1920, when along with several other Eastern Orthodox jurisdictions in the defunct Austro-Hungarian Empire, as well as the Metropolitanate of Cetinje, it was merged with the Metropolitanate of Belgrade to form the united Serbian Orthodox Church. The seat of the Patriarchate was in Karlovci (today Sremski Karlovci, Serbia).

History
At the May Assembly in Sremski Karlovci in 1848, prior to the Serb uprising of 1848–49, the Serbs of the Habsburg monarchy proclaimed the creation of the Serbian Vojvodina, a Serb autonomous region within the Monarchy. The metropolitan of Karlovci, Josif Rajačić, was also proclaimed "Serbian Patriarch", thus the Metropolitanate of Karlovci became a Patriarchate. The title of "Serbian Patriarch" given to Rajačić was confirmed by the Emperor Franz Joseph I the same year.

This confirmation of Rajačić as the Serbian Patriarch, and Stevan Šupljikac as Vojvoda, was a political move made by Emperor Franz Joseph I. He was confronted with revolution in his country and had difficulties subduing the Hungarians under Kossuth. Šupljikac and his Croatian counterpart, Josip Jelačić supported the Emperor against the Hungarians.

The position of Serbian Orthodox Church and Serbs in Austria and Hungary was regulated in reforms brought about first by Empress Maria Theresa and later by Emperor Joseph II. The Serbian Church-Public Council of 1769 regulated the Serbs and their Church status in a special paper named "Regulament" and, later, in the "Declaratory Rescript of the Illyrian Nation" issued by Maria Theresa in 1779. These acts regulated the life of the Metropolitanate of Karlovci until 1868. Emperor Franz Joseph I published a special edict regulating Serbian Orthodox Church affairs and his edict was in force until the unification of Serbian Churches in 1920.

The establishment of the Patriarchate in Karlovci was seen as restoration of Serbian unity in Austria and Hungary and the patriarch was even considered the ranking personage among the Serbs. Some authors claimed that actually the Habsburg dynasty in Austria founded the patriarchate of Karlovci.

In 1865, the Eastern Orthodox Romanians that were under jurisdiction of the Patriarchate of Karlovci were separated and transferred to the jurisdiction of newly created Romanian Metropolitanate of Sibiu. Process was accomplished by mutual agreement that included the transfer of the Eparchy of Arad and eastern parts of Eparchy of Temišvar and Eparchy of Vršac.

In 1873, Bishopric of Chernivtsi in Bukovina, that was since 1783 under the spiritual jurisdiction of Karlovci, was elevated to the rank of Archbishopric when new Metropolitanate of Bukovinian and Dalmatia was created. New Archbishop of Chernivtsi gained jurisdiction over Serbian eparchies of Dalmatia and Kotor, that also were (until then) under spiritual jurisdiction of Karlovci.

Emperor Franz Joseph I exercised full control over the Patriarchate. In 1890, contrary to the Serb Church Congress ruling and the Orthodox tradition, he promoted Georgije Branković to the patriarchal throne. That way the emperor discredited the Church hierarchy in the eyes of laity and encouraged rise of the anti-clerical Serb People's Radical Party in Austria-Hungary.

The last patriarch, Lukijan Bogdanović, was murdered in 1913. After his death, the patriarchal throne remained vacant for the last seven years of its existence, with following bishops serving as locum tenens: Miron (Nikolić) of Pakrac (1913 and 1914–1919),  of Gornji Karlovac (1913–1914) and Georgije (Letić) of Temišvar (1919–1920; coadjutor 1918–1919).

Following the dissolution of the Austria-Hungary in the autumn of 1918, the Patriarchate of Karlovci was in 1920 merged into the newly united Serbian Orthodox Church under one Serbian patriarch residing in Belgrade.

Eparchies
It included following eparchies:

Patriarchs, 1848–1920

See also
 Metropolitanate of Karlovci
 Serbian Orthodox Church
 List of heads of the Serbian Orthodox Church
 Religion in Serbia
 Religion in Vojvodina

References

Literature

 
 
 
 
 
 Dušan Popov, Karlovačka mitropolija, Enciklopedija Novog Sada, sveska 10, Novi Sad, 1998.

External links

1848 establishments in the Austrian Empire
1920 disestablishments in Yugoslavia
Defunct religious sees of the Serbian Orthodox Church
Habsburg Serbs
History of Syrmia
History of the Serbian Orthodox Church
Religious organizations established in 1848
Religious organizations disestablished in 1920
Serbian Vojvodina
Vojvodina under Habsburg rule